Omares was a Persian, commander of 20,000 Greek mercenaries in the battle of the Granicus (modern-day Turkey). He was killed during the battle.

References

334 BC deaths